Mindrup House-Store is a historic home and store located at Augusta, St. Charles County, Missouri. The house was built about 1860, and is a three-story, facchwerk timber frame dwelling.  The store occupied the first floor with living quarters above.  A two-story brick and frame addition was added about 1890.  The addition has a hipped roof and features a two-story gallery porch.

It was added to the National Register of Historic Places in 1995.

References

Houses on the National Register of Historic Places in Missouri
Houses completed in 1860
Buildings and structures in St. Charles County, Missouri
National Register of Historic Places in St. Charles County, Missouri